Mugan may refer to:
Merkhav Mugan, Israeli air raid shelter
Mugan Khan, Central Asian Khan
Mugan plain, in northwestern Iran and the southern part of the Republic of Azerbaijan
Hovtamej, Armenia
Muğan Gəncəli, Azerbaijan
Muğan, Bilasuvar, Azerbaijan
Muğan, Hajigabul, Azerbaijan
Muğan, Jalilabad, Azerbaijan